Fathabad (also Romanized as Fatḩābād; also known as Patava) is a village in Meydan Chay Rural District, in the Central District of Tabriz County, East Azerbaijan Province, Iran. At the 2006 census, its population was 1,610, in 461 families.

References 

Populated places in Tabriz County